Martin Philip Head-Gordon (né Martin Philip Head)  is a professor of chemistry at the University of California, Berkeley, and Lawrence Berkeley National Laboratory working in the area of computational quantum chemistry.  He is a member of the International Academy of Quantum Molecular Science.

Education
A native of Australia, Head-Gordon received his Bachelor of Science and Master of Science degrees from Monash University, followed by a PhD from Carnegie Mellon University working under the supervision of John Pople developing a number of useful techniques including the Head-Gordon-Pople scheme for the evaluation of integrals, and the orbital rotation picture of orbital optimization.

Career and research
At Berkeley, Martin supervises a group interested in pairing methods, local correlation methods, dual-basis methods, scaled MP2 methods, new efficient algorithms, and very recently corrections to the Kohn-Sham density functional framework.  Broadly speaking, wavefunction based methods are the focus of his research. Head-Gordon is one of the founders of Q-Chem Inc.

Awards and honors
In 2015, Head-Gordon was elected a Member of the National Academy of Sciences.

References 

Living people
Members of the International Academy of Quantum Molecular Science
Australian emigrants to the United States
Carnegie Mellon University alumni
UC Berkeley College of Chemistry faculty
Fellows of the American Academy of Arts and Sciences
1962 births
Computational chemists
Theoretical chemists
Schrödinger Medal recipients